The Crowninshield–Bentley House (circa 1727–1730) is a Colonial house in the Georgian style, located at 126 Essex Street, Salem, Massachusetts in the Essex Institute Historic District. It is now owned by the Peabody Essex Museum and open for public tours from June to October.

The house was originally built for sea captain John Crowninshield at a site on 106 Essex Street. It is a symmetrical five-bay structure, clapboarded, two stories tall, with three small dormers through the roof, and a central entry door. Compare it with the architecture of the Ropes Mansion and the Peirce-Nichols House, also in Salem, and also owned by the Peabody Essex Museum.  Some believe it may have started as a "half house" on the east side, and been expanded in 1761 and again in 1794. The building was moved to its present location in 1959–1960, at which time it was restored.

Four generations of Crowninshields lived in the house until 1832. Its main historical interest centers upon Reverend William Bentley, a boarder from 1791 to 1819.

It has been suggested that this house may be the model for "the old Crowninshield house" mentioned in the H. P. Lovecraft story "The Thing on the Doorstep".

See also
List of historic houses in Massachusetts

External links
 Salem Tales: Reverend William Bentley

References 

 Bryant F. Tolles, Jr., Architecture in Salem: An Illustrated Guide, University Press of New England, Hanover and London, reissued 2004.
 Quantum Sigil Magic: 

Houses completed in 1730
Crowninshield family
Historic house museums in Massachusetts
Houses in Salem, Massachusetts
Peabody Essex Museum
1730 establishments in Massachusetts